Eilward (also noted as Agilward, Elvart, Eilbart, Erward, Ediward, Eduard, Hildeward or Hildebert; d. 24 November 1023), a member of the Saxon noble house of the Ekkehardiner(de), was Bishop of Meissen from 1016 to 1023.

Eilward, a younger son of Margrave Ekkehard I of Meissen and his wife Schwanhild, daughter of Hermann Billung, was appointed bishop by Emperor Henry II. During his years in office his brother was Margrave of Meissen as Hermann I.

References

Roman Catholic bishops of Meissen
1023 deaths
Year of birth unknown
House of Ekkehardiner